Ashley Elizabeth Hinson (born June 27, 1983) is an American politician and journalist serving as the U.S. representative for Iowa's 2nd congressional district. She has served in the House since 2021, representing a northeastern district including Cedar Rapids, Waterloo, Cedar Falls, and Dubuque.

A member of the Republican Party, Hinson was the Iowa State Representative for the 67th district from 2017 to 2021, the first woman to represent the district. She won a seat in the United States House of Representatives in the 2020 election, narrowly defeating incumbent Democrat Abby Finkenauer. Hinson and Mariannette Miller-Meeks are the first Republican women to represent Iowa in the House.

Early life, education and career 
A native of Des Moines, Iowa, Hinson is a graduate of Valley High School in West Des Moines and the University of Southern California, where she studied broadcast journalism. She is an alumna of the Pi Beta Phi sorority. Hinson began her career as an anchor for KCRG-TV.

Iowa House of Representatives

Elections 
In 2016, Hinson ran for Iowa's 67th House District, based in Linn County, Iowa. She defeated Democrat Mark Seidl, 62.5%-37.5%.

This Cedar Rapids suburban district is very competitive. 2016 Democratic presidential nominee Hillary Clinton won it over Donald Trump by two percentage points.

In 2018, Hinson faced a competitive race against teacher Eric Gjerde. She defeated him, 52%–48%.

Committee assignments 
In the Iowa House, Hinson served on the Judiciary committee, the Public Safety committee, and the Transportation committee, which she chaired. She also served on the Transportation, Infrastructure, and Capitals Appropriations Subcommittee.

U.S. House of Representatives

Elections

2020

On May 13, 2019, Hinson filed paperwork to run against Democratic incumbent Abby Finkenauer in Iowa's 1st congressional district.

The district, which encompasses 20 counties in northeastern Iowa, was flipped in the 2018 election. Hinson was announced as a "contender" by the National Republican Congressional Committee. She was endorsed by Iowa Governor Kim Reynolds and Lieutenant Governor Adam Gregg. On June 2, 2020, Hinson won the Republican primary.

Hinson focused her campaign on cutting taxes and building infrastructure. In July 2020, The New York Times reported several instances of Hinson's campaign website plagiarizing portions of articles from media outlets. Hinson said she "was unaware of the plagiarism when I reviewed drafts presented to me by staff. As a journalist I take this extremely seriously and am deeply sorry for the mistake. The staff responsible will be held accountable."

Hinson beat Finkenauer in the November general election.

2022

On October 29, 2021, most of Hinson's territory, including her home in Marion, near Cedar Rapids, became the 2nd district due to redistricting, and Hinson announced she would seek reelection there. In effect, she traded district numbers with fellow freshman Republican Mariannette Miller-Meeks. Hinson defeated Democratic nominee Liz Mathis in the general election.

Tenure 
Hinson, along with all other Senate and House Republicans, voted against the American Rescue Plan Act of 2021.

On July 19, 2022, Hinson and 46 other Republican Representatives voted for the Respect for Marriage Act, which would codify the right to same-sex marriage in federal law.

In 2022, Hinson was one of 39 Republicans to vote for the Merger Filing Fee Modernization Act of 2022, an antitrust package that would crack down on corporations for anti-competitive behavior.

Infrastructure 
In 2021, Hinson voted against the Infrastructure Investment and Jobs Act.

Social Security 
In 2020, Hilson said she was "open" to raising the retirement age for Social Security.

Committee assignments 

 Committee on Appropriations
 Subcommittee on Transportation, and Housing and Urban Development, and Related Agencies
 Subcommittee on  Homeland Security
 Committee on Budget

Caucus memberships 
Republican Study Committee

Electoral history

Personal life 
Hinson is a resident of Marion, Iowa. She is married with two children.

Hinson is a Protestant.

See also 

 Women in the United States House of Representatives

References

External links 

Representative Ashley Hinson official U.S. House website
 Ashley Hinson at Iowa Legislature
 Campaign website
 Biography at Ballotpedia
 

|-

 

|-

 

1983 births
21st-century American journalists
21st-century American politicians
21st-century American women politicians
American Protestants
American television news anchors
American women television journalists
Christians from Iowa
Female members of the United States House of Representatives
Journalists from Iowa
Living people
Republican Party members of the Iowa House of Representatives
People from Marion, Iowa
People from West Des Moines, Iowa
Protestants from Iowa
Republican Party members of the United States House of Representatives from Iowa
University of Southern California alumni
Women state legislators in Iowa